Madame Golvery is a 1923 Czech silent film directed by Václav Binovec and starring Suzanne Marwille, V. Ch. Vladimírov and Hugo Svoboda.

The film's art direction was by Fritz Kraenke and Bohuslav Šula.

Cast
 Suzanne Marwille as Zina Golveryová  
 V. Ch. Vladimírov as Petr Vladimír  
 Hugo Svoboda as Zarozin 
 J. Rubek as Prince Alexander Teveklov  
 A. Palenová as Xenie Martanová  
 Paul Rehkopf as Petr Bertram 
 Alois Sedlácek
 Else Engel 
 Willy Kaiser-Heyl 
 Hermann Böttcher

References

Bibliography
 Jean Mitry. Histoire du cinéma: 1915-1925. Éditions universitaires, 1995.

External links

1923 films
Czech silent films
Czech black-and-white films
Films directed by Václav Binovec